The 49th Annual Japan Record Awards took place at the New National Theatre in Shibuya, Tokyo, on December 30, 2007, starting at 6:30PM JST. The primary ceremonies were televised in Japan on TBS.

Awards winners 
Japan Record Award: Tsubomi
Artist and Arranger: Kobukuro
Songwriter and Composer: Kentaro Kobuchi
Record companies: Warner Music Japan
Best Vocal Performance: Exile
Best New Artist: Cute
Gold Awards:
ayaka
w-inds.
Exile
Ai Otsuka
Miyuki Kawanaka
Kumi Koda
Kobukuro
Kiyoshi Hikawa
BoA
Kaori Mizumori
New Artist Awards:
Cute
Jyongri
Stephanie
Satomi Takasugi

See also 
58th NHK Kōhaku Uta Gassen

References

External links
Official Website.
Complete list of all winners.

Japan Record Awards
Japan Record Awards
Japan Record Awards
Japan Record Awards
2007